Diogo Silvestre Bittencourt (born 30 December 1989) is a Brazilian footballer who plays for Vitória ES as a left back.

Honours
São Paulo U-17 State Championship: 2006
Dallas Cup: 2007

External links
 O Gol
 Guardian Stats center
 Diogo Silvestre at ZeroZero

References

1989 births
Living people
Brazilian footballers
Brazil youth international footballers
Brazil under-20 international footballers
Brazilian expatriate footballers
Campeonato Brasileiro Série A players
Uruguayan Primera División players
São Paulo FC players
Goiás Esporte Clube players
R.S.C. Anderlecht players
S.C. Braga B players
C.D. Feirense players
Peñarol players
Estudiantes de La Plata footballers
Danubio F.C. players
Clube Atlético Juventus players
Associação Ferroviária de Esportes players
Vitória Futebol Clube (ES) players
Argentine Primera División players
Expatriate footballers in Argentina
Expatriate footballers in Belgium
Expatriate footballers in Portugal
Expatriate footballers in Uruguay
People from Paranavaí
Association football defenders
Sportspeople from Paraná (state)